The surname Aitken  is derived from the Lowland Scots personal name Aitken, which is in turn a form of the name Adam. At the time of the British Census of 1881, its frequency was highest in Peeblesshire (23.6 times the British average), followed by Linlithgowshire, Haddingtonshire, Stirlingshire, Fife, Dunbartonshire, Clackmannanshire, Shetland, Edinburghshire and Ayrshire.

The name Aitken may refer to:
 Abbi Aitken-Drummond (born 1991), Scottish cricketer
 A.J. Aitken, Scottish lexicographer
 Alexander Aitken, New Zealand mathematician
 Andrew Aitken, one of several people including
 Andrew Aitken (footballer, born 1909), (1909–1984), English footballer
 Andrew Peebles Aitken (1843–1904), Scottish agricultural chemist
 Andy Aitken (footballer, born 1877) (1877–1955), Scottish footballer
 Anne Hopkins Aitken (1911–1994), American Buddhist
 Aubrey Aitken (1911–1985), second Bishop of Lynn, 1972–1986
 Bill Aitken, one of several people including
 Bill Aitken (politician), Scottish politician.
 Bill Aitken (traveller), Scottish-born writer and traveller
 Brad Aitken (born 1967), Canadian ice-hockey player
 Brian Aitken, libertarian activist convicted on gun-related charges in New Jersey and subsequently granted clemency
 Charles Aitken, English art administrator
 Charlie Aitken (footballer born 1932), Scottish footballer
 Charlie Aitken (footballer born 1942), Scottish footballer
 Chris Aitken (born 1948), Australian rugby player
 Chris Aitken (born 1979), Scottish footballer and manager
 David D. Aitken, American politician from Michigan
 Bruce Aitken, New Zealand Multi Awarding Winning Drummer
 Edward Hamilton Aitken, Scottish writer
 Ewan Aitken, Scottish politician and ordained minister
 George Aitken, one of several people including
 George Aitken (footballer, born 1928) (1928–2006), Scottish footballer and manager
 George Aitken (politician) (1836–1909), merchant and politician in Prince Edward Island, Canada
 George Atherton Aitken CB, MVO (1860–1917), a British civil servant, author, scholar, and a literary biographer
 Glenn Aitken, one of several people including:
 Glenn Aitken (footballer), English football player
 Glenn Aitken (singer), London-based New Zealand singer-songwriter and musician
 Harry Aitken (1877–1956), American silent film producer
 Hayley Aitken, Australian singer
 Ian Aitken (disambiguation), one of several people including:
 Ian Aitken (journalist) (1927–2018), British journalist and political commentator
 Ian Aitken (footballer) (born 1967), former Australian rules footballer
 Jack Aitken, British-Korean racing driver
 Jacqueline Aitken, British children's writer Jacqueline Wilson
 James Macrae Aitken (1908–1983), Scottish chess player and World War II cryptographer
 Janet Gladys Aitken (1908–1988), Canadian-British socialite
 Janet Macdonald Aitken (1873-1941), Scottish artist
 Jim Aitken, Scottish rugby player
 John Aitken, one of several people including
 John Aitken (music publisher) (c. 1745–1831), Scottish-American music publisher
 John Aitken (politician) (1849–1921), mayor of Wellington, New Zealand
 Johnny Aitken (1885–1918), racing driver
 Johnathan Aitken (born 1978), Canadian ice-hockey player
 Jonathan Aitken (born 1942), British former Conservative minister and convict
 Kate Aitken, Canadian broadcaster
 Kelley Aitken, Canadian writer
 Laurel Aitken, Jamaican ska musician
 Maria Aitken (b. 1945), British actress
 Matt Aitken of Stock Aitken Waterman, British record producer
 Max Aitken, 1st Baron Beaverbrook (1879–1964), Canadian-British business tycoon and politician
 Sir Max Aitken, 2nd Baronet, British press baron and politician
 Maxwell Aitken, 3rd Baron Beaverbrook, British politician
 Hon. Maxwell Francis Aitken
 Michael James Aitken, AM, Australian academic and entrepreneur
 Nicholas Aitken aka Wilbur Wilde, Australian saxophonist
 Pauline Aitken (1893–1958), British artist
 Lady Penelope Aitken (1910–2005), British socialite and daughter of the first Baron of Rugby
 Robert Aitken, one of several people including
 Robert Aitken (Bible Publisher) (1734–1802), American bible publisher
 Robert Aitken (composer) (b. 1939), Canadian flutist and composer
 Sir Robert Aitken (1901 – 1997)  University administrator in New Zealand and England
 Robert Baker Aitken (1917–2010), American teacher of Zen Buddhism, grandson of Robert Grant Aitken
 Robert Grant Aitken (1864–1951), American astronomer
 Robert Hope Moncrieff Aitken, Scottish soldier
 Robert Ingersoll Aitken, American sculptor
 Robert P. Aitken (1819–1873) Michigan Republican Congressman from 1865 to 1868
 Robin Aitken, British journalist
 Roy Aitken, Scottish football player and manager
 Russell Aitken, Australian rugby league player
 Russell Aitken (RAF officer) (1913–1989), New Zealand pilot
 Sally Aitken, Canadian environmentalist
 Samuel Aitken, Scottish football player
 Suzy Aitken, New Zealand TV personality
 Violet Aitken (1886 – 1987) was a British suffragette who was force-fed
 William McKay Aitken (born 1934), Scottish-born writer and traveller, long a citizen and resident of India
 William Aitken (politician) (1905–1964), journalist and politician
 William Aitken (footballer) (1894–1973), Scottish soccer player
 William Alexander Aitken (1785–1851), fur trader with the Ojibwe
 William Aitken (pathologist) (1825–1892), Scottish pathologist
 William Traven Aitken, British politician, father of Jonathan Aitken

Aitkens
 Michael Aitkens, British television writer

See also
 Aitken (disambiguation)
 Aitkin (disambiguation)
 Atkin (disambiguation)

References

Scottish surnames